Sopa de gato (in English: 'cat soup') is a simple soup typical of the classic cuisine of southern Spain. It is a very thick sopa (soup) served hot. It is a suitable dish for the winter months. Typical ingredients in the dish's preparation include water, bread, oil, garlic and salt.

History 
In the 16th century, the city of Cádiz was besieged by pirates and subject to continuous looting and raids. In light of the resulting widespread hunger, sopa de gato was born out of the creativity and necessity of the locals.

Features 
Sopa de gato is made with plenty of olive oil and garlic, usually with ground pepper added to the mixture. The ingredients are very inexpensive. Once the oil, water, and garlic have been brought to a boil, add stale bread cut into very thin slices. Beaten eggs with grated cheese may also be added. Cover the pot and remove from heat. Notably, sopa de gato does not include paprika, and is made without any stock per se.

See also

 List of soups
 Migas canas
 Sop
 Spanish cuisine

References

Spanish soups and stews